Cooperation between China and Germany was instrumental in modernizing the industry and the armed forces of the Republic of China between 1912 and 1941.

At the time, China was fraught with factional warlordism and foreign incursions. The Northern Expedition (1928) nominally unified China under Kuomintang (KMT) control, but Imperial Japan loomed as the greatest foreign threat. The Chinese urgency for modernising its military and national defence industry, coupled with Germany's need for a stable supply of raw materials, put China and the German Weimar Republic on the road to close relations from the late 1920s onwards. That continued for a time following the rise of the Nazis in Germany. However, intense cooperation lasted only until the start of the Second Sino-Japanese War in 1937. The German cooperation nevertheless had a profound effect on the modernisation of China and its ability to resist the Japanese during the war.

Background 
The earliest Sino-German trade occurred overland through Siberia, and was subject to transit taxes by the Russian government. To make trading more profitable, Prussia decided to take the sea route, and the first German merchant ships arrived in Qing China, as part of the Royal Prussian Asian Trading Company of Emden in the 1750s. In 1861, after China's defeat in the Second Opium War, the Treaty of Tientsin was signed, which opened formal commercial relations between various European states, including Prussia, with China.

In the late 19th century, trade with China was dominated by the British, who operated from Canton at first and later at Shanghai and Hong Kong. German Chancellor Otto von Bismarck sought to establish a foothold in China to offset the British dominance. In 1885, he obtained a steamship subsidy bill and thereby set up direct service to China. The same year, he sent the first German banking and industrial survey group to evaluate investment possibilities, which led to the establishment of the Deutsch-Asiatische Bank in 1890. Those German efforts were second to Britain in trading and shipping in China by 1896.

The perception that the Germans were interested only in trade made the Qing government looked to them as a partner to help China's modernization effort. In the 1880s, the German shipyard AG Vulcan Stettin built two of the most modern and powerful warships of its day (the pre-dreadnought battleships Zhenyuan and Dingyuan) for the Chinese Beiyang Fleet.

After China's first modernization efforts looked to be a failure after its crushing defeat in the first Sino-Japanese War in 1895, Chinese General Yuan Shi-kai requested German help in creating the Self-Strengthening Army and the New Army (新建陸軍; Xīnjìan Lùjūn). German assistance concerned military, industrial, and technical matters. For example, in the late 1880s, the Chinese government signed a contract with the German company Krupp to build a series of fortifications around Port Arthur.

Germany's relatively benign China policy, which was shaped by Bismarck, changed and gradually withered away under later German chancellors during the reign of Wilhelm II. After German naval forces were sent in response to attacks on missionaries in Shandong Province, Germany negotiated at the a 99-year leasehold for Kiautschou Bay in March 1898 and began to develop the region. The period of the Boxer Rebellion of 1900 proved the low point in Sino-German relations and witnessed the assassination of the German minister to China, Baron Clemens von Ketteler, and other foreign nationals. The tiny contingent of troops then in North China wanted to exact retribution for the murder of the diplomat. On 27 July 1900, Wilhelm II spoke during departure ceremonies for the German contribution to the international relief force. He made an impromptu but intemperate reference to the "Hun invaders" of Continental Europe, which was later resurrected by Allied propaganda against Germany during both World War I and World War II.

In the decade before World War I, Sino-German relations became less engaged. One reason was the political isolation of Germany, as was evident by the 1902 Anglo-Japanese Alliance and the 1907 Triple Entente. Germany proposed a German-Chinese-American entente in 1907, but the proposal never came to fruition. In 1912, Germany granted a six-million German Goldmark loan to the new Chinese Republican Government. When World War I broke out in Europe, Germany offered to return Kiautschou Bay to China in an attempt to keep its colony from falling into Allied hands. However, the Japanese pre-empted that move and entered the war on the side of the Triple Entente, invading Kiautschou during the Siege of Tsingtao. As the war progressed, Germany had no active role or initiative in conducting any purposeful actions in East Asia, as it was preoccupied with the war in Europe.

On 14 August 1917, China declared war on Germany and recovered the German concessions in Hankow and Tientsin. As a reward for joining the Allies, China was promised the return of other German spheres of influence after the defeat of Germany. However, at the Paris Peace Conference, Japan's claims trumped prior promises to China, and the Treaty of Versailles assigned the up-to-date city of Tsingtao and the Kiautschou Bay region to Japan. The subsequent recognition of that Allied betrayal sparked the nationalist May Fourth Movement, which is regarded as a significant event in modern Chinese history. As a result, the Beiyang government refused to sign the treaty.

World War I dealt a severe blow to Sino-German relations. Long-established trade connections had been destroyed and financial structures and markets wrecked. Of the almost 300 German firms conducting business in China in 1913, only two remained in 1919.

1920s 
Under the terms of the Treaty of Versailles, the German Army (Reichswehr) was restricted to 100,000 men, and its military industrial production was greatly reduced. However, the treaty did not diminish Germany's place as a world leader in military innovation, and German industry retained the machinery and technology to produce military hardware. Therefore, to circumvent the treaty's restrictions, industrial firms formed partnerships with foreign nations such as the Soviet Union and Argentina to produce weapons and sell them legally.

As the Chinese government did not sign the Treaty of Versailles, a separate peace treaty was concluded in 1921.

After the death of Yuan Shi-kai, the Beiyang government collapsed, and the country fell into civil war, with various Chinese warlords vying for supremacy. German arms producers began looking to re-establish commercial links with China to tap into its vast market for weapons and military assistance.

The Kuomintang government also sought German assistance, and the German-educated Chu Chia-hua (朱家驊; Zhū Jiāhuá) arranged almost all of the Sino-German contacts from 1926 to 1944. There were several reasons other than Germany's technological expertise that made it the top candidate in Chinese foreign relations. Firstly, Germany had no interest on having colonies in China after World War I. Secondly, unlike the Soviet Union, which helped with Kuomintang reorganization and opened party membership to communists, Germany had no political interest in China that could lead to confrontations with the central government. Moreover, Chiang Kai-shek saw German unification as something from which China could learn and emulate. Thus, Germany was seen as a primary force in the "international development" of China.

In 1926, Chu Chia-hua invited Max Bauer to survey investment possibilities in China, and the next year, Bauer arrived in Guangzhou and was offered a post as Chiang Kai-shek's advisor. Soon, he managed to recruit 46 other German officers to advise and train Nationalist forces while he devised the strategy that allowed the Nationalists to win their 1929 campaigns against the warlords. In 1928, Bauer returned to Germany to recruit a permanent advisory mission for China industrialization efforts. However, Bauer was not entirely successful, as many firms hesitated because of China's political instability and because of Bauer being persona non grata for his participation in the 1920 Kapp Putsch. In addition, Germany was still constrained by the Treaty of Versailles, which made direct military investment impossible. After he returned to China, Bauer contracted smallpox, died, and was buried in Shanghai. Bauer provided the foundation for later Sino-German co-operation. He argued for the reduction of the Chinese army to produce a small but elite force and supported opening of the Chinese market to spur German production and exports.

1930s 
Sino-German trade slowed between 1930 and 1932 because of the Great Depression. Chinese progress towards industrialization was further hampered by conflicting interests between various Chinese reconstruction agencies, German industries, German import-export houses and the German army. Events did not pick up speed until the 1931 Mukden Incident, which showed the need for a concrete military and industrial policy aimed at resisting Japanese encroachment. In essence, it spurred the creation of a centrally-planned national defence economy. That consolidated, Chiang's rule in China hastened industrialization efforts.

The 1933 seizure of power by the Nazi Party further accelerated Sino-German cooperation. However, this began to change as the 1930s progressed, as "the Nazi government began leaning noticeably closer to Japan" while "the advisors (and many members of the German army) continued to push for a stronger Sino-German relationship".

Before the Nazi rise to power, however, German policy in China had been contradictory, as the Foreign Ministry under the Weimar government had urged neutrality and discouraged the Reichswehr from becoming directly involved with the Chinese government. The same feeling was shared by the German import-export houses for fear that direct government ties would exclude them from profiting as the middleman. On the other hand, the new government's policy of Wehrwirtschaft (defense economy) called for the complete mobilization of society and the stockpiling of military raw materials, which China could supply in bulk.

In May 1933, Hans von Seeckt arrived in Shanghai and was offered to oversee economic and military development involving Germany in China. He submitted the Denkschrift für Marschall Chiang Kai-shek memorandum, outlining his programme of industrialising and militarising China. He called for a small, mobile, and well-equipped force to replace the massive but under-trained army. In addition, he advocated for the army to be the "foundation of ruling power" and for military power to rest in qualitative superiority derived from qualified officers.

Von Seeckt suggested that the first step toward achieving this framework was the uniform training and consolidation of the Chinese military under Chiang's command and that the entire military system must be subordinated into a centralised hierarchy. Toward that goal, von Seeckt proposed the formation of a "training brigade" to replace the German eliteheer, which would train other units, with its officer corps selected from strict military placements.

In addition, with German help, China would have to build up its own defence industry because it could not rely on buying arms from abroad much longer. The first step toward efficient industrialization was the centralization of both the Chinese and the German reconstruction agencies. In January 1934, the Handelsgesellschaft für industrielle Produkte, or Hapro, was created to unify all German industrial interests in China. Hapro was nominally a private company to avoid opposition from other foreign countries. In August 1934, the Treaty for the Exchange of Chinese Raw Materials and Agricultural Products of German Industrial and Other Products was signed in which China would trade strategically important raw material for German industrial products and development. That barter agreement was to both since China was unable to secure external monetary loans because of the high budget deficit from military expenditures, and Germany could become independent of the international market for raw materials. The agreement further specified that China and Germany were equal partners. Having accomplished that important milestone in Sino-German cooperation, von Seeckt transferred his post to General Alexander von Falkenhausen and returned to Germany in March 1935, where he died the next year.

H.H. Kung, the finance minister of China, and two other Chinese Kuomintang officials visited Germany in June 1937 and were received by Adolf Hitler. The Chinese delegation met Hans Georg von Mackensen on June 10. During the meeting, Kung said that Japan was not a reliable ally for Germany, as he believed that Germany had not forgotten the Japanese invasion of Tsingtao and the former German colonies in the Pacific Islands during World War I, and that China was the true anticommunist state, but Japan was only "flaunting." Von Mackensen promised that there would be no problems in Sino-German relations as long as he and von Neurath were in charge of the Foreign Ministry. Kung also met Hjalmar Schacht on the same day, who explained to him that the Anti-Comintern Pact was not a German-Japanese alliance against China. Germany was glad to lend China 100 million Reichsmark (equivalent  to € million) and would not do so with the Japanese.

Kung visited Hermann Göring on June 11, who told him he thought that Japan was a "Far East Italy," in reference to the fact that during World War I Italy had broken its alliance and declared war against Germany, and Germany would never trust Japan. Kung asked Göring, "Which country will Germany choose as her friend, China or Japan?" Göring said China could be a mighty power and that Germany would take China as a friend.

Kung met Hitler on June 13, who told him that Germany had no political or territorial demands in the Far East, Germany was a strong industrial country, China was a huge agricultural country, and Germany's only thought on China is business. Hitler also hoped China and Japan could co-operate and that he could mediate any disputes between these two countries since he mediated the disputes between Italy and Yugoslavia. Hitler also told Kung that Germany would not invade other countries but was not afraid of foreign invasion. If the Soviet Union dared to invade Germany, one German division could defeat two Soviet corps. The only thing that Hitler feared was Bolshevism in Eastern Europe. Hitler also said that he admired Chiang Kai-Shek because he had built a powerful central government.

Kung met von Blomberg on the afternoon of June 13 and discussed the execution of 1936 HAPRO Agreement. The German Ministry of War agreed to lend China 100 million Reichsmark to purchase German weapons and machines. To repay the loan, China agreed to provide Germany with tungsten and antimony.

Kung left Berlin on June 14 to visit the United States and returned to Berlin on August 10, one month after the Second Sino-Japanese War broke out. He met von Blomberg, Hjalmar Schacht, von Mackensen, and Ernst von Weizsäcker and asked them to mediate the war.

German aid to Chinese industrialization 

In addition, half of them were in Japanese-controlled Manchuria. The slow progress of modernising China's transport was caused by conflicting foreign interests. Chinese external credits needed approval from British, French, American, and Japanese banks as stated in the 1920 New Four-Power Consortium. In addition, other foreign countries were hesitant to provide funding because of the Great Depression.

However, a series of Sino-German agreements in 1934–1936 greatly accelerated railway construction in China. Major railways were built between Nanchang, Zhejiang, and Guizhou. The rapid developments could occur because Germany needed efficient transportation to export raw materials, and the railway lines served the Chinese government's need to build an industrial centre south of the Yangtze. In addition, the railways served important military purposes. For example, after the Hangzhou-Guiyang railway was built, military transport could pass through the Yangtze Delta Valley, even after Shanghai and Nanking had been lost. Similarly, the Guangzhou-Hankou railway provided transport between the eastern coast and the Wuhan area and would later prove its worth in the early stages of the Second Sino-Japanese War.

The most important industrial project from the Sino-German cooperation was the 1936 Three-Year Plan, which was administered by the Chinese government's National Resources Commission and the Hapro corporation. Its purposes were to create an industrial powerhouse, which could resist Japan in the short run and create a centre for future Chinese industrial development for the long run. It had several basic components, such as the monopolisation of all operations of tungsten and antimony; the construction of the central steel and machine works in Hubei, Hunan, and Sichuan; and the development of power plants and chemical factories. Cost overrun for the projects was partly assuaged by the fact that the price of tungsten had more than doubled between 1932 and 1936. Germany also extended a 100 million Reichsmark line of credit to the Kuomintang. The Three-Year Plan introduced a class of highly educated technocrats to run the state-owned projects. At the height of the programme, trade with Germany accounted for 17% of China's foreign trade and China was the third largest trading partner with Germany. The Three-Year Plan had many promises, but many of its intended benefits would be undermined by the start of the Second Sino-Japanese War.

German aid to modernization of Chinese military 

Alexander von Falkenhausen was responsible for most of the military training. Von Seeckt's original plans called for a drastic reduction of the military to 60 elite divisions, which would be modeled on the Wehrmacht, but the factions that would be axed remained an open question. As a whole, the officer corps trained by the Whampoa Academy until 1927 had been only marginally better in quality than the warlord armies, but remained loyal to Chiang. Nonetheless, some 80,000 Chinese troops, in eight divisions, were trained and formed the elite of Chiang's army. However, China was not ready to face Japan on equal terms, and Chiang's decision to pit all of his new divisions in the Battle of Shanghai, which Japan won, despite objections from his staff officers and von Falkenhausen, would cost him a third of his best troops. Chiang switched his strategy to preserve strength for the eventual Chinese Civil War.

Von Falkenhausen recommended for Chiang to fight a war of attrition, as Falkenhausen calculated that Japan could not win a long-term war. He suggested for Chiang to hold the Yellow River line and not to attack until later in the war. Also, Chiang should give up a number of provinces in northern China, including Shandong. Falkenhausen also recommended the construction of a number of fortifications at strategically important locations to slow a Japanese advance. Falkenhausen also advised the Chinese to establish a number of guerrilla operations behind Japanese lines.

Von Falkenhausen believed that it was too optimistic to expect the National Revolutionary Army (NRA) to be supported by armor and heavy artillery because the industry lacked the necessary capacity. Thus, he emphasized the creation of a mobile force that relied on small arms and would be adept with infiltration tactics, like those of the German stormtroopers around the end of World War I. German officers were called into China as military advisers, like Lieutenant Colonel Hermann Voigt-Ruscheweyh, who acted as adviser to the Artillery Firing School in Nanking from 1933 to 1938.

German assistance in the military was not limited to personnel training and reorganisation but also included military hardware. According to von Seeckt, around 80% of China's output of weapons were below par or unsuitable for modern warfare. Therefore, projects were undertaken to modernise existing arsenals. For example, the Hanyang Arsenal was reconstructed in 1935 and 1936 to produce Maxim machine guns, various 82 mm trench mortars, and the Chiang Kai-shek rifle (based on the German Mauser Standardmodell and  Karabiner 98k rifles). The Chiang Kai-shek and Hanyang 88 rifles remained as the predominant firearm used by Chinese armies throughout the war. Another factory was established to produce gas masks, but plans for a mustard gas plant were eventually scrapped. In May 1938, several arsenals were built in Hunan to produce 20mm, 37 mm, and 75 mm artilleries. In late 1936, a plant was built near Nanking to manufacture binoculars and sniper rifle sights. Additional arsenals were built or upgraded to manufacture other weapons and ordnance, such as the MG-34, pack guns of different calibres, and even replacement parts for vehicles of the Leichter Panzerspähwagen. Several research institutes were also established under German auspices, such as the Ordnance and Arsenal Office and the Chemical Research Institute, under the direction from IG Farben. Many of those institutes were headed by Chinese engineers who had returned from Germany. In 1935 and 1936, China ordered a total of 315,000 of the M35 Stahlhelm and many Gewehr 88, 98 rifles and the C96 Broomhandle Mauser. China also imported other military hardware, such as a small number of Henschel, Junkers, Heinkel and Messerschmitt aircraft, some of them to be assembled in China, and Rheinmetall and Krupp howitzers, anti-tank, and mountain guns, such as the PaK 37mm, as well as armoured fighting vehicles such as the Panzer I.

The modernization efforts proved to be useful in the war. Although the Japanese were able to capture the Nationalist capital at Nanking, the process took several months, with far larger losses than either side had anticipated. Despite the defeat, the fact that Chinese troops could challenge Japanese troops boosted Chinese morale. In addition, the cost of the campaign made the Japanese reluctant to go more deeply into the Chinese interior, allowing the Nationalist government to relocate China's political and industrial infrastructure into Sichuan.

End of co-operation 
The outbreak of the Second Sino-Japanese War, on July 7, 1937, destroyed much of the progress and promises that had been made. Hitler chose Japan as his ally against the Soviet Union because Japan was militarily capable. In addition, the Sino-Soviet Non-Aggression Pact of August 21, 1937 did not help change Hitler's mind, despite protest from Chinese lobbies and German investors. However, Hitler agreed to have Hapro finish shipments that had been ordered by China though he refused to allow taking any more orders from Nanking.

There were plans of a German-mediated peace between China and Japan, but the fall of Nanking in December 1937 effectively put an end to any mediation that would be acceptable to the Chinese government. Therefore, all hope of a German-mediated truce was lost. In 1938, Germany officially recognised Manchukuo as an independent nation. In April that year, Göring banned the shipment of war materials to China, and in May, German advisors were recalled to Germany after the Japanese had insisted.

The shift from a pro-China policy to a pro-Japan damaged German business interests, as Germany had far less economic exchange with Japan. Pro-China sentiment was also apparent in most Germans in China. For example, Germans in Hankow raised more money for the Red Cross than all other Chinese and foreign nationals in the city combined. Military advisors also wished to honour their contracts with Nanking. Von Falkenhausen was finally forced to leave at the end of June 1938 but promised Chiang that he would never reveal his work to aid the Japanese. On the other hand, Nazi Party organs in China proclaimed Japan as the last bulwark against communism in China.

Germany's relationship with Japan would prove to be less fruitful. Japan seized foreign businesses in North China and Manchukuo, and German interests were treated no better than others. Negotiations were ongoing in mid-1938 to address the economic problems, but the next year, Hitler agreed to the Molotov–Ribbentrop Pact, which effectively nullified the Anti-Comintern Pact of 1936. The Soviet Union agreed to allow German use of the Trans-Siberian Railway to transport goods from Manchukuo to Germany. However, quantities remained low, and the lack of established contacts and networks between Soviet, German, and Japanese personnel compounded the problem further. When Germany attacked the Soviet Union in 1941, Germany's economic goals in Asia were conclusively ended.

China and Germany continued to maintain diplomatic relations in 1941, with elements from both sides wishing to resume co-operating despite the declining German interest in Asia. However, Germany's failure to defeat the United Kingdom steered Hitler away from that move. Germany signed the Tripartite Pact, along with Japan and Italy, at the end of 1940. In July 1941, Hitler officially recognised Wang Jingwei's puppet government in Nanking. After the attack on Pearl Harbor, China formally joined the Allies and declared war on Nazi Germany on December 9, 1941.

Legacy 

The Sino-German cooperation of the 1930s was perhaps the most ambitious and successful of Sun Yat-sen's ideal "international development" to modernise China. Germany's loss of her territories in China after the First World War, its need for raw materials and its lack of interest in Chinese politics, all advanced the rate and the productiveness of its cooperation with China since both countries were able to cooperate on the basis of equality and economic dependability. China's urgent need for industrial development to fight an eventual showdown with Japan also precipitated that progress. Furthermore, China's admiration of the rapid rise of Germany after its defeat in the First World War and its fascist ideology also prompted some Chinese within the ruling circle to fashion fascism as a quick solution to China's continuing woes of disunity and political confusion.

In summation, although the period of Sino-German cooperation spanned only a short period of time, and much of its success was destroyed in the war with Japan, it had some lasting effect on China's modernisation. After the Kuomintang was defeated during the Chinese Civil War, it relocated to Taiwan. Many government officials of the Republic of China on Taiwan were trained in Germany, such as Chiang's son, Chiang Wei-kuo. Much of Taiwan's rapid postwar industrialization can be attributed to the plans and the goals laid down in the 1936 Three-Year Plan. One example was Taiwan fertilizer plant was built from a former German gun powder reactor accelerated the agricultural needs after the government moved to Taiwan.

See also 

 China–Germany relations
Persecution of Chinese people in Nazi Germany
Whampoa Military Academy
German East Asia Squadron
History of the Republic of China

Notes

References

Citations

Sources 

 
 China Year Book, 1929–1930 (1930). North China Daily News & Herald.
 Chu Tzu-shuang. (1943) Kuomintang Industrial Policy Chungking.
 
 
 
 
 
 
 
 
 US War Department Strategic Service Unit (1946), German Intelligence Activities In China During World War II (Declassified and Approved for Release By The Central Intelligence Agency, Nazi War Crimes Disclosure Act)

External links 

Letter from Chiang Kai-shek to Adolf Hitler
German Military Mission to China 1928–1938
Photos of Hitler together with Chinese delegates before end of cooperation

20th century in China
20th century in Germany
20th-century military alliances
History of the foreign relations of Germany
Foreign relations of the Republic of China (1912–1949)
Military history of the Republic of China (1912–1949)
Military history of China during World War II
Military history of Germany during World War II
National Revolutionary Army
Military alliances involving China
Military alliances involving the German Empire
Military alliances involving Nazi Germany
China–Germany military relations